Tista De Lorenzo (born 23 August 1934) is  a former Australian rules footballer who played with Richmond in the Victorian Football League (VFL).

Notes

External links 		
		
		
		
		
		
		
Living people		
1934 births		
		
Australian rules footballers from Victoria (Australia)		
Richmond Football Club players
Dandenong Football Club players